The WFTDA East Region Playoffs or WFTDA Eastern Regional Tournament was one of four annual roller derby regional qualifying tournaments for the WFTDA Championships.

The Tournament was organised by the Women's Flat Track Derby Association (WFTDA).  Full WFTDA members in the Eastern Region members were eligible for ranking, and the top ten leagues would qualify for the Eastern Regional Tournament, and the top three finalists would qualify for the Championships. Together, the four qualifying tournaments and Championships were termed the "Big 5". Starting with the 2013 WFTDA season, WFTDA's regions were discontinued in favor of an overall-rankings based system, and a new playoff format was created.

Championships

2007 Heartland Havoc
The 2007 Eastern Regional Tournament was held August 17 - 19 in Columbus, Ohio. It was a 12-team single-elimination tournament with the same structure as February's Dust Devil Western Regional. There were numerous upsets on the second day: Chicago's Windy City Rollers, ranked #14 in the nation at the time, defeated the Mad Rollin' Dolls of Madison, Wisconsin, ranked #1 at the time.  Additionally, the #19 Detroit Derby Girls defeated the #6 Minnesota Rollergirls, and the #10 Gotham Girls Roller Derby defeated #9 Philly.  In the championship bout, Gotham beat Windy City, 134–71.

2008 Derby In Dairyland
On October 10, 2008, the Gotham Girls Roller Derby (GGRD All-Stars) beat the Windy City Rollers 133-92 in the championship bout. Philly Rollergirls' Liberty Belles beat the Carolina Rollergirls 112-48 in the consolation bout to take third place.

2009 Wicked Wheels of the East
On September 13, 2009, the Philly Rollergirls' Liberty Belles beat Gotham Girls Roller Derby 90-89 in the East championship bout. The Boston Derby Dames' Boston Massacre defeated the Charm City Rollergirls 156-142 to take 3rd place.

2010 Derby In the Burbs
The 2010 tournament was held in White Plains, NY, and featured the first appearance by a non-American team at a WFTDA regional tournament, in 6th-ranked Montreal Roller Derby's New Skids on the Block, who wound up finishing in 7th place.  Gotham won the tournament for the third time in four years, defeating Philly 133 - 103 on day three, while 4th-ranked Charm City beat Boston 162 - 128 to take third place.

References

Recurring sporting events established in 2007
East Region (WFTDA)
Roller derby competitions
Women's Flat Track Derby Association